The Korean Sport & Olympic Committee (Abbr.: KOC) is the National Olympic Committee of Republic of Korea (competing as Korea) for the Olympic Games movement and inbound sports issue. It is a non-profit organization that selects players and teams to represent the nation, and raises funds to send them to Olympic events organized by the International Olympic Committee (IOC).

History
The Joseon Sports Council was established on 13 July 1920, and it made Korean national competitions of each sport including All Joseon Football Tournament. The competitions were combined as the All Joseon Sport Games (currently Korean National Sports Festival) in 1934, and the combined competition was held every autumn. However, the Joseon Sports Council was forcibly dissolved by Japan on 4 July 1938, and Korean sporting activities were restricted until the end of the Japanese occupation.

The council was revived after Korean independence in 1945, and joined the IOC on 20 June 1947. It also established the Korean Olympic Committee (KOC) to prepare for the Olympic Games in that year. The council was renamed the Korea Amateur Sports Association (KASA) in 1954, and the Korea Sports Council (KSC) in 1994. The KASA succeeded in hosting the 1988 Summer Olympics in Seoul, and South Korea finished fourth in that edition, which was its best ever result in Olympics. The KOC was merged into the KSC on 24 June 2009, but the organization used KOC as its name. It once again merged with the Korea Council of Sport for All in March 2016, and named the current "Korean Sport & Olympic Committee" in November 2016, but the emblem of the committee is remaining the same as previous.

On 2 November 2018, officials from both North and South Korea announced that their countries would participate at the 2020 Summer Olympics, held in Tokyo, Japan, as a unified team. The officials from both Koreas also announced that the letters they would send to the IOC regarding their bids for hosting the 2032 Summer Olympics would also consist of co-host bids so that the Olympic activities would take place in both nations if their bids were accepted as well.

Presidents and IOC members

Korean Sports Hall of Fame

Olympic sports

Other sports

Administration

See also
Korean Paralympic Committee
Sport in South Korea
South Korea at the Olympics
South Korea at the Asian Games
Ministry of Culture, Sports and Tourism

References

External links 

Korea, South
South Korea at the Olympics
 
Sports organizations established in 1946
1946 establishments in Korea